Kara Shepherd (February 18, 1911 - October 1984) was an African-American surrealist painter.

A native of Culpeper, Virginia, where she was born on the family farm, Shepherd early expressed an interest in art, receiving encouragement from her parents. She studied at the Philadelphia School of Art in 1926; the Art Students League of New York in 1950; Fordham University in 1960; the École des Beaux-Arts, Fontainelbleau from 1962 to 1964; and Arizona State University from 1979 to 1980. Her work is represented in public and private collections.

References

1911 births
1984 deaths
American surrealist artists
American women painters
African-American women artists
20th-century American painters
20th-century American women artists
Art Students League of New York alumni
Fordham University alumni
Arizona State University alumni
People from Culpeper, Virginia
Painters from Virginia
20th-century African-American women
20th-century African-American people
20th-century African-American painters